A Cinderella Story: Christmas Wish is a 2019 American teen comedy musical film written and directed by Michelle Johnston and starring Laura Marano and Gregg Sulkin. It is the fifth installment of A Cinderella Story film series. The film was released digitally on October 15, 2019, and DVD on October 29, 2019. Its sequel, A Cinderella Story: Starstruck, was released in 2021.

Plot
Katherine "Kat" Decker (Laura Marano) is a young teenage girl who dreams of becoming a great singer-songwriter. Unfortunately after her father, Jason, died, she is left in the care of her evil, snobbish stepmother, Deirdre (Johannah Newmarch), and her two equally cruel and snobby stepsisters, Joy (Lillian Doucet-Roche) and Grace (Chanelle Peloso). They work Kat to the bone as a servant, have full control of her inheritance, and take a big percentage of her wages from work. Kat's goal is to make enough money to move out of her home and pursue her dreams.

Kat works at "Santa Land", a Christmas entertainment park, as a singer along with her best friend, Isla (Isabella Gomez), under the eye of their strict boss, Mr. Mujiza (Garfield Wilson). There they meet a new employee as the new Santa, who, unknown to them, is really Dominic "Nick" Wintergarden (Gregg Sulkin), son of billionaire, Terrence Wintergarden (Barclay Hope), and after Nick sees Kat perform, he is smitten by her.

Deirdre wants to go to a charity event Terrence is hosting, but she doesn't have a way to get in. Then through Grace's mumbling, she suggests taking advantage of Terrence's personal connection to Kat's late father. They devise a plan to enter the charity event as Deirdre being the widow of the late Jason Decker and her two daughters. However, a letter from Terrence requests the presence of Deirdre and Katherine Decker, so Joy will be impersonating Kat to make the scam work in their favor while leaving the real Kat in the dark with nothing.

As Christmas Eve nears, Nick and Kat become attracted to one another. Nick then gives Kat an invitation to the Wintergarden charity event, much to Kat's surprise and bewilderment, and she accepts the invitation. The next day, Nick reveals his true identity to Kat, and tries to encourage her to do the same but she doesn't. Kat, while reluctant to go to the event with Dominic, is expressing her desire to not go; however, Isla persuades her to do so and gives her a green dress they saw at an expensive boutique store which Isla had handsewn herself.

The next morning, however, her stepfamily steal her dress and Deirdre burns her invitation to prevent her from going. Kat calls Isla about what her stepfamily did, and is informed that Dominic has invited her to come over to his home and hear her sing with his friend. When she does come over, Kat gets an unfriendly appreciation from Nick's friends, especially his girlfriend, Skyler, which eventually causes her to leave.

On the day of the charity event, Kat catches her stepfamily in possession of her late father's snow globe. During the altercation to get it back, the snow globe breaks and the stepfamily leave her heartbroken. While sobbing, Kat's dog, Bruno, stumbles upon the invitation letter from Terrence. Realizing their intention of using her identity, she becomes more determined to stop them. To help Kat get in the event and stop the stepfamily, Isla uses her position as a dressmaker for the event's main show to help her pass as one of the elf performers. But before Kat can get to Terrence, she is forced to go on stage and perform, which she does poorly. In the middle of the performance, both Deirdea and Nick see Kat and both try to get to her. Skyler tries to get together with Nick, but Nick breaks up with her over Kat.

Kat unintentionally knocks out one of the performers in the show, and is forced to be the Snow Queen for the next part. Kat is reluctant at first, but Isla convinces her to sing. Nick and Kat finally find each other with Nick apologizing for hurting her and Kat for ruining the show. Before leaving, Nick advises Kat to follow her dreams for her father. Though nervous at first, Kat gives a wonderful performance to the audience with a new song she wrote.

After the show, Nick introduces Kat to Terrence. After hearing Kat's problems with her stepfamily and her financial insecurities, Terrence offers to help her with her problems as a last wish to his late friend, then he orders Deirdre, Joy and Grace to leave. Nick and Kat finally accept each other and they happily dance together.

Cast
 Laura Marano as Kat Decker 
 Gregg Sulkin as Dominic Wintergarden 
 Isabella Gomez as Isla
 Barclay Hope as Terrence Wintergarden
 Maddie Phillips as Skyler 
 Johannah Newmarch as Deirdre Decker 
 Lillian Doucet-Roche as Joy Decker 
 Chanelle Peloso as Grace Decker 
 Garfield Wilson as Mr. Mujiza

Production
Principal photography began in March 2019 in Vancouver.

Soundtrack

The accompanying soundtrack album was released on November 22, 2019 by WaterTower Music.

Track listing

Songs that are not included on the soundtrack album:
 "Jingle Bells" by Laura Marano and Isabella Gomez
 "Deck the Halls" by Laura Marano and Isabella Gomez
 "What Elves Are For" by The Math Club and Ryan Franks
 "Fortress" by Opus Orange

See also
 List of Christmas films

References

External links
 

A Cinderella Story (film series)
2019 comedy films
2019 direct-to-video films
2010s Christmas comedy films
2010s musical comedy films
2010s teen comedy films
American Christmas comedy films
American direct-to-video films
American musical comedy films
American sequel films
American teen comedy films
American teen musical films
Blue Ribbon Content films
Direct-to-video comedy films
Direct-to-video sequel films
Films based on Charles Perrault's Cinderella
Films directed by Michelle Johnston
Films scored by Jake Monaco
Films shot in Vancouver
Warner Bros. direct-to-video films
2010s English-language films
2010s American films